Michał Wiśniowiecki (died 1616) was a Polish–Lithuanian Commonwealth szlachcic, prince at Wiśniowiec, magnate, son of Michał Wiśniowiecki, grandfather of future Polish–Lithuanian Commonwealth monarch, Michał Korybut Wiśniowiecki. Starost of Owrucz.

He took part in the Magnate wars in Moldavia and supported False Dmitriy I and False Dmitriy II during the Muscovite Time of Troubles and the Polish–Muscovite War (1605–18). He was also involved in extinguishing Nalyvaiko Uprising.

His son Jeremi after his death was raised by his relative, Konstanty Wiśniowiecki and eventually became a powerful magnate, one of the most famous members of the Wiśniowiecki family. His daughter Anna Wiśniowiecka was a potential marriage candidate to the king Władysław IV Waza in 1636. Although Władysław was quite supportive of the marriage, it was blocked by the Sejm. Anna eventually married Zbigniew Firlej between 1636 and 1638.

Marriage and issue
Michał married Regina Wisniowiecka and had two children:
 Jeremi Michał Wiśniowiecki, voivode of Ruthenia, married Gryzelda Zamoyska h. Jelita
 Anna Wiśniowiecka, married starost of Lublin Zbigniew Firlej h. Lewart

See also
 List of szlachta

References

16th-century births
1616 deaths
Michal Wisniowiecki 15--